Laura a její tygři ("Laura and her tigers") is a Czech musical group influenced by the funk, soul, jazz and rock.

Profile 
In 1985 Karel Šůcha founded the group "Laura a její a tygři" at the Neprakta club in Most, Czech Republic. The name was inspired by the Tracy's Tiger novel by American writer William Saroyan. From the start the group members use the same dress code: white shirts and black sunglasses, neckties and trousers. Since 1999 the band employs only professional, formally trained musicians. Today the only remaining founding member is Karel Šůcha. The past group members include Jana Amrichová, Martin Pošta, Ilona Csáková, Dan Nekonečný, Miloš Vacík, Ivan Myslikovjan, Tereza Hálová, Lenka Nová, Vladěna Svobodová etc.

Members 
In 2018 the group members include:
Karel Šůcha – group leader, bass guitar, vocal
Lucie Bakešová – vocal
Miroslav Návrat – percussions
Tomislav Zvardoň – guitar
Ondřej Fišer – guitar, vocal
Kamil Janský – saxophone, vocal, road manager
Milan Král – trombone, vocal
Radek Němec – trumpet, vocal

Discography 
 Žár trvá – Panton Records 1988 
 Nebudeme – Supraphon 1990 
 Síla v nás – Bonton 1992 
 The Best Of – Bonton 1994 
 Rituál 199x – Bonton 1995 
 Vyklátíme modly – Bonton 1996 
 Rytmus – Popron 2001 
 Vyškrábu ti oči – EMI 2004 
 Jsme tady! – Supraphon 2005 – Best of
 Nejsou malý věci – 2009
 Big Bang! – 2011 (CD, DVD)
 Žár trvá / Továrna na sny – 2016

References 

''Article contains translated text from Laura a její tygři on the Czech Wikipedia retrieved on 11 January 2019.

External links 
 Official website
 Facebook
 Instagram
 YouTube
 Profile on Bandzone.cz
 Discography on diskografie.cz
 TV interview with Karel Šůcha

Czech alternative rock groups
Czech jazz ensembles
Czech rock music groups
Musical groups established in 1985
Musical groups from Prague
1985 establishments in Czechoslovakia